The 2001 WNBA Championship was the championship series of the 2001 WNBA season, and the conclusion of the season's playoffs. The Los Angeles Sparks, top-seeded champions of the Western Conference, defeated the Charlotte Sting, fourth-seeded champions of the Eastern Conference, two games to none in a best-of-three series. This was Los Angeles' first title.

The Sparks made their first appearance in the Finals in franchise history. The Sting also made their first Finals appearance.

Going into the series, no other team except the Houston Comets had ever won a WNBA championship (1997-2000).

The Sparks had a 28–4 record (.875), good enough to receive home-court advantage over the Sting (18–14). It did not matter, however, as the Sparks swept the Sting.

Road to the finals

Regular season series
The Sparks won the regular season series:

Game summaries
All times listed below are Eastern Daylight Time.

Game 1

Game 2

Awards
2001 WNBA Champion: Los Angeles Sparks
Finals MVP: Lisa Leslie

Rosters

{| class="toccolours" style="font-size: 95%; width: 100%;"
|-
! colspan="2" style="background-color: #5c2f83; color: #FFC322; text-align: center;" | 2001 Los Angeles Sparks Finals roster
|- style="background-color: #FFC322;color: #FFFFFF; text-align: center;"
! Players !! Coaches
|-
| valign="top" |
{| class="sortable" style="background:transparent; margin:0px; width:100%;"
! Pos. !! # !! Nat. !! Name !! Height !! Weight !!class="unsortable"| !! From
|-

{| class="toccolours" style="font-size: 95%; width: 100%;"
|-
! colspan="2" style="background-color: #0196B0; color: #FFFFFF; text-align: center;" | 2001 Charlotte Sting Finals roster
|- style="background-color: #4B0082;color: #FFFFFF; text-align: center;"
! Players !! Coaches
|-
| valign="top" |
{| class="sortable" style="background:transparent; margin:0px; width:100%;"
! Pos. !! # !! Nat. !! Name !! Height !! Weight !!class="unsortable"| !! From
|-

Finals
Los Angeles Sparks
Charlotte Sting
WNBA Championship
WNBA Championship
Women's National Basketball Association Finals
WNBA Championship
WNBA Championship
Basketball competitions in Charlotte, North Carolina
Basketball competitions in Los Angeles
WNBA Championship